Jim Lykam (born December 16, 1949) is an American politician. He serves in the Iowa Senate, representing the 45th district. He previously represented the 89th district in the Iowa House of Representatives from 2003 to 2017.

Lykam received his AA from Palmer Junior College.

Lykam serves on several committees in the Iowa House - the Local Government committee; the Natural Resources committee; the Transportation committee, where he is vice chair; and the Public Safety committee, where he is chair. He also serves on the Transportation, Infrastructure, and Capitals Appropriations Subcommittee.

Lykam was re-elected in 2006 with 5,623 votes (54%), defeating Republican opponent Roby Smith. 

In December 2016, Lykam won a special election to the Iowa Senate.

References

External links
Representative Jim Lykam official Iowa General Assembly site
Jim Lykam State Representative official constituency site
 

Democratic Party members of the Iowa House of Representatives
Democratic Party Iowa state senators
Living people
1949 births
Politicians from Davenport, Iowa
21st-century American politicians